Hartheim may refer to:

Germany:
 Hartheim am Rhein
 Hartheim, Meßstetten, part of Meßstetten

Austria:
 Hartheim, Alkoven, part of Alkoven
 Hartheim Euthanasia Centre in Hartheim, Alkoven
 Schloss Hartheim, Alkoven